Yeletsky (masculine), Yeletskaya (feminine), or Yeletskoye (neuter) is the name of several inhabited localities in Russia.

Urban localities
Yeletsky, Komi Republic, an urban-type settlement under the administrative jurisdiction of the town of republic significance of Vorkuta, Komi Republic

Rural localities
Yeletsky, Lipetsk Oblast, a settlement in Yeletsky Selsoviet of Yeletsky District of Lipetsk Oblast
Yeletskoye, Belgorod Oblast, a selo in Novooskolsky District of Belgorod Oblast
Yeletskoye, Lipetsk Oblast, a selo in Leninsky Selsoviet of Lipetsky District of Lipetsk Oblast